Upper Bushman Lake is a 30-acre lake along the Clinton River.  The lake, with a maximum depth of 32 feet, lies within Independence Township in Oakland County, Michigan.

The lake is located east of Sashabaw Road, south of Oak Hill Road, within the Independence Oaks County Park.

Upper Bushman Lake connects downstream to Crooked Lake

References

Lakes of Oakland County, Michigan
Lakes of Michigan
Lakes of Independence Township, Michigan